David Edward Luscombe  (22 July 1938 – 30 August 2021) was a British medievalist. He was professor emeritus of medieval history at the University of Sheffield. He was elected a fellow of the British Academy in 1986. He was also a fellow of the Royal Historical Society and the Society of Antiquaries of London. He was the joint editor of volume four of The New Cambridge Medieval History.

Luscombe died on 30 August 2021, at the age of 83.

Honours
In 2014, Luscombe was awarded the British Academy Medal for his book The Letter Collection of Peter Abelard and Heloise.

Selected publications
Medieval Thought. Oxford University Press, Oxford, 1997.
The New Cambridge Medieval History, Volume 4, c. 1024–c. 1198. Cambridge University Press, Cambridge, 2004. (Editor with Jonathan Riley-Smith)
The School of Peter Abelard. Cambridge University Press, Cambridge, 2008.
A Monastic Community in Local Society: The Beauchief Abbey Cartulary. Cambridge University Press, Cambridge, 2012. (Editor with David Hey & Lisa Liddy)

References 

1938 births
2021 deaths
British medievalists
Academics of the University of Sheffield
Fellows of King's College, Cambridge
Alumni of the University of Cambridge
Fellows of the British Academy
Fellows of the Royal Historical Society
Recipients of the British Academy Medal
Fellows of Churchill College, Cambridge